Daugavpils (see other names) is a state city in south-eastern Latvia, located on the banks of the Daugava River, from which the city gets its name. The parts of the city north of the river belong to the historical Latvian region of Latgale, and those to the south lie in Selonia.

Daugavpils is a major railway junction and industrial centre and was an historically important garrison city lying approximately midway between Riga and Minsk, and between Warsaw and Saint Petersburg.

Daugavpils, then Dyneburg, was the capital of Polish Livonia while in Polish–Lithuanian Commonwealth. Following the first partition of Poland in 1772, the city became part of the Russian Empire. Since the Second World War, it has maintained an overwhelmingly Russian-speaking population, with Latvians and Poles being significant minorities. Historically, German and Yiddish were additional prominent native languages.

Names

In the Latvian language, the current name Daugavpils references Daugava (the Latvian name of the Western Dvina River) and the Latvian word pils (meaning "castle" - cognate with Lithuanian pilis and with Greek polis).

Historically, several names in various languages have identified Daugavpils. Some are still in use today.

 
 
  (Düna - the Western Dvina River + an early form of German Burg - "fortress" or "castle")
 
 
 

Chronology of name changes
 Dünaburg (1275–1656)
 Borisoglebsk (1656–1667)
 Dünaburg (1667–1893)
 Dvinsk (1893–1920)
 Daugavpils (since 1920)

History

The town's history began in 1275 when the Livonian Order, led by Ernst von Ratzeburg, built Dünaburg Castle  up the Daugava river from where Daugavpils is now situated. In 1561 it became part of the Grand Duchy of Lithuania and, subsequently, of the Polish–Lithuanian Commonwealth in 1569 (see Duchy of Livonia). In 1621 Daugavpils became the capital of the newly formed Inflanty Voivodeship, which existed until the First Partition of Poland (1772). In 1577 the Russian tsar Ivan the Terrible captured and destroyed Dünaburg castle. That same year, a new castle and a town were built  downriver, by the Polish King Stephen Báthory. In 1582 Daugavpils was granted Magdeburg town rights. In the 17th century, during the Russo-Swedish War initiated by Tsar Alexis of Russia, the Russians captured Daugavpils, renamed the town Borisoglebsk and controlled the region for 11 years, between 1656 and 1667. Russia returned the area to Polish–Lithuanian Commonwealth following the Treaty of Andrusovo (1667). It became part of the Russian Empire after First Partition of Poland in 1772. It was an uyezd center firstly in Pskov Governorate between 1772 and 1776, Polotsk one between 1776 and 1796, Belarus one between 1796 and 1802 and finally Vitebsk between 1802 and 1917 as Dinaburg firstly, as Dvinsk later during Russian rule.

From 1784 onwards the city had a large and active Jewish population among them a number of prominent figures. According to the Russian census of 1897, out of a total population of 69,700, Jews numbered 32,400 (ca. 44% percent).

As part of the Russian Empire, the city was called Dvinsk from 1893 to 1920. The newly independent Latvian state renamed it Daugavpils in 1920. Latvians, Poles and Soviet troops fought the Battle of Daugavpils in the area from 1919 to 1920. Daugavpils and the whole of Latvia was under the Soviet Union rule between 1940–41 and 1944–1991. Nazi Brandenbergers led the German attack against the town in 1941, speaking Russian and wearing Soviet uniforms, and Germany occupied it between 1941 and 1944. The Nazis established the Daugavpils Ghetto where the town's Jews were forced to live. Most were murdered. In the late Soviet era, there was a proposal to build a hydroelectric power station on the Daugava river that was successfully opposed by the nascent environmental movement in Latvia.

On 16 April 2010 an assassin shot vice-mayor Grigorijs Ņemcovs in the center of the city. He died almost immediately and the crime remains unsolved.

Jewish history

Prior to 1941, Daugavpils, called Dvinsk by its Jewish inhabitants, was home to the most prominent Jewish community in eastern Latvia. The city was already a Jewish center as early as the 1780s and by the time of the 1897 census, they numbered 32,400 (44% of the overall population of the city). By 1911 they had increased to 50,000. The Jews of the town were very prosperous and ran 32 factories and there were 4000 artisans among them.

The city not only boasted a large Jewish population but a rich religious culture including 40 synagogues. The city was home to two of the most prominent rabbis of their time: Joseph Rosen (1858-1936), known as the Rogatchover Gaon (genius from Rahachow), was famed for his commentaries on the works of Maimonides and on the Talmud. Famed for his acidic wit and penetrating genius, he led the towns Hasidic Jews. His 'competitor', the leader of the local Misnagdim (non-Hasidic Jews) was the Rabbi Meir Simcha of Dvinsk (1843-1926). Rabbi Meir Simcha was also renowned for his work on Maimonides (Or Somayach) as well as Bible commentary Meshech Chochma. In one famous comment he predicted that since some Jews had assimilated and viewed Berlin as their 'Jerusalem' they would suffer persecution originating in Berlin.

Another famous Jewish resident was the abstract expressionist painter Mark Rothko. Born in Daugavpils in 1903 he immigrated at the age of 10 to the United States where he painted over 800 paintings in his unique style.

Jewish Daugavpils came to an end following the Nazi German invasion on 26 June 1941. Falsely claiming that the Jews had conspired to set fire to the town and that they were assisting the Soviet army, the Germans and their Latvian collaborators carried out large executions on 28–29 June. During July the Jews were enslaved and forced to cut down timber. On 7–11 July Einsatzkommando 1b under Erich Ehrlinger executed many of the remaining Jews. Later in July the 14,000 remaining Jews were forced into a Ghetto along with those from nearby towns. By the end of August an additional 7000 Jews had died at the hands of the Nazis and the local Latvian collaborators. The largest execution took place in November 1941 and was followed by plagues that decimated the few survivors. Only about 1500 Jews remained in the city. These were murdered on 1 May 1942. When the town was liberated in 1944 only 100 survivors remained of a community of 16,000. For more on the Holocaust in Daugavpils see Daugavpils Ghetto.

Geography

Climate 
The city has a continental climate with warm summers and cold winters. Under the Köppen climate classification, Daugavpils features a humid continental climate (Dfb).

Demographics

As of 1 January 2020, the city had a population of 82,046. In Daugavpils 85% of the voters supported the proposal to make Russian the second state language in the 2012 referendum.

Religion

Church Hill (Baznīcu kalns) is a city landmark. Very prominently, all of the main denominations practiced in Latvia: Lutheran, Catholic, Orthodox and Old Believer are represented.

Places of worship in the city:

 Martin Luther Cathedral
 Ss. Boris and Gleb Cathedral
 St. Alexander Nevsky Cathedral
 St. Alexander Nevsky Church
 Immaculate Conception Catholic Church
 St. Peter-in-Chains Catholic Church
 Heart of Jesus Catholic Church
 Grīva Catholic Church
 First Old Believers’ House of Prayer
 Vecforštate Old Believers' House of Prayer
 Daugavpils Synagogue - restored 2003-2006

Before the Second World War, there were more than 40 synagogues in the city.

Art, architecture, and culture

Daugavpils is an important cultural centre in eastern Latvia. There are 22 primary and secondary schools, four vocational schools, and the Saules College of Art. More than 1,000 teachers and engineers graduate from the University of Daugavpils (formerly Daugavpils Pedagogical University) and the local branch of Riga Technical University annually.
There is also a Polish gymnasium on Varšavas iela (Warsaw Street).

In 2007 the Daugavpils Theatre was restored. There is also one cinema as well as other cultural institutions. The city exhibition center offers many cultural activities.

There are also several architectural, historical, and cultural monuments in Daugavpils. The most prominent is the Daugavpils fortress dating mostly from the 18th and 19th centuries. In April 2013 the Mark Rothko Art centre was opened in the fortress.

Historical centre
The historical centre of Daugavpils city is an architectural heritage of national importance (the construction work was carried out in the 19th century according to the project endorsed in St Petersburg in 1826).
The historical centre is the greatest attraction of the city and one of the most successful examples of balancing the aspects of ancient and modern times. Daugavpils is one of the few cities in Latvia which can pride itself on a unified ensemble of both classic and eclectic styles. The cultural heritage of architectural, artistic, industrial, and historical monuments combined with the picturesque surroundings create the essence of Daugavpils’ image and endow it with a special charm.

In 2020 the municipality allocated 70,000 euros for the restoration of eight historical buildings, including Art Nouveau and red brick buildings.

Red brick buildings

Daugavpils is exceptionally rich in red brick buildings. This style was developed by many outstanding architects. In Daugavpils, this variety of eclecticism is most widely represented in the buildings designed by Wilhelm Neumann, an architect of German origin who was the chief architect of the city from 1878 to 1895. Bright examples of brick architecture are the buildings at 1/3 Saules Street and at 8 Muzeja Street. The shape-forming techniques typical of eclecticism that were applied in the façades of these buildings even many decades later make one appreciate and admire the striking accuracy of detail.

Transport

Daugavpils satiksme AS oversees the city's bus and tram networks.

The city's railway station is the terminus of the Riga–Daugavpils Railway. There is a train connection to Vilnius during the weekends.

The airport was denationalized in 1993 and since 2005 there had been plans to redevelop the former military facility to allow both international and domestic passenger traffic, as well as international and domestic cargo transport and charter flights, before they were eventually cancelled in 2021. Griva Airfield is located 4 km NW of Daugavpils, next to the river. It's movements mainly involve parachute jumping and paragliding.

Government

The head of the city government is the mayor of Daugavpils or, literally, 'Council Chairman' (domes priekšsēdētājs). The incumbent since January 2019 is Andrejs Elksniņš from Harmony, albeit coalition talks are still ongoing. "Our Party" governed in coalition with the Latgale Party of the previous mayor Jānis Lāčplēsis. Eigims was previously mayor from 2001–2003 as leader of the Light of Latgale party and briefly in 2009 as a member of the Latvian Social Democratic Workers' Party.

The Council consists of 15 members who are elected every four years. The most recent election was in 2017.

Economy
During the Soviet time, the city was well industrialised with a number of prominent large manufacturing units. However, nowadays only a few of those have remained still working. The city council is trying to attract new investments and thus created a number of free industrial zones around the whole city that might be interesting due to the strategically efficient geographical position of the city close to the Russian, Belarusian and Lithuanian borders.

Sports

The Speedway Grand Prix of Latvia is currently held at the Latvijas Spīdveja Centrs with America's triple World Champion Greg Hancock being the most successful rider in Latvia winning the GP in 2009, 2009 and 2013. Lokomotiv Daugavpils is a Motorcycle speedway team which successfully competes in the Polish league system.

The football clubs FC Daugava and BFC Daugavpils play at Celtnieks Stadium in Daugavpils. Both teams plays in the Latvian Higher League. In the past there was Dinaburg FC which played at the former Daugava Stadium.

FBC Latgale represent the city in floorball. There is also a hockey team called HK Dinaburga, which currently plays in the Latvian Hockey Higher League.

In 2008 the construction of the Daugavpils Multifunctional Sports Complex was started and was completed in October 2009.

Notable residents

Andris Ambainis (born 1975), Latvian computer scientist
Aleksandrs Cauņa (born 1988), Latvian footballer
Teresa Czerwińska (born 1974), Polish economist, Minister of Finance of Poland (2018–)
Leonid Dobychin (1894–1936), Russian writer
Kastuś (Kanstantyn)Jezavitaŭ (1893 - 1946), political and military leader within the Belarusian independence movement
Movsas Feigins (Movša Feigins, 1908–1950), Latvian chess master
Grzegorz Fitelberg (1879–1953), Polish composer and conductor
Isser Harel (born Isser Halperin) (c. 1912–2003), Israeli spymaster
Gotthard Kettler (1517–1587), last Master of the Livonian Order and the first Duke of Courland and Semigallia
Abraham Isaac Kook (1864–1935), rabbi, thinker, diplomat, mediator, scholar
Pinchas HaKohen Lintup (1851–1924), rabbi and Kabbalist
Solomon Mikhoels (1890–1948), Soviet Jewish actor and director
Grigorijs Ņemcovs (1948–2010), Latvian journalist, businessman and politician
Nicolai Poliakoff OBE (1900–1974), creator of Coco the Clown
Władysław Raginis (1908–1939), Polish officer
Rogatchover Gaon (1858–1936), rabbi
Mark Rothko (1903–1970), American abstract expressionist painter
Isaak Illich Rubin (1886–1931), Jewish political economist and socialist activist
Artjoms Rudņevs (born 1988), Latvian footballer
Uļjana Semjonova (born 1952), basketball player
Meir Simcha of Dvinsk (1843–1926), rabbi
Isaac Nachman Steinberg (1888–1957), writer, politician, co-founder of the Freeland League
Władysław Studnicki (1867-1953), Polish politician and publicist
Stanisław Swianiewicz (1899–1997), Polish economist and historian
Deniss Vasiļjevs (born 1999), Latvian figure skater
Vitas (born 1979), Russian singer, songwriter, composer, actor and fashion designer
Viktoria Modesta (born 1988), Latvian-born British singer-songwriter, performance artist, and model

Twin towns – sister cities

Daugavpils is twinned with:

  Alaverdi, Armenia
  Babruysk, Belarus
  Batumi, Georgia
  Central Administrative Okrug (Moscow), Russia
  Ferrara, Italy
  Harbin, China
  Kharkiv, Ukraine
  Lida, Belarus
  Magdeburg, Germany
  Motala, Sweden
  Naro-Fominsk, Russia
  Panevėžys, Lithuania
  Pskov, Russia
  Radom, Poland
  Ramla, Israel
  Saint Petersburg, Russia
  Vagharshapat, Armenia
  Vitebsk, Belarus

Gallery

Significant depictions in popular culture
 Dunaburg (Daugavpils) is one of the starting towns of the State of the Teutonic Order in the turn-based strategy game Medieval II: Total War: Kingdoms.

See also
Daugavpils Ice Arena

Notes

References

External links

 Information portal 
 Information-entertaining portal 

 Enterprises of Daugavpils
 The murder of the Jews of Daugavpils during World War II, at Yad Vashem website.
 
 Daugavpils City Government 

 
Cities in Latvia
Republican cities of Latvia
Populated places established in the 13th century
Dvinsky Uyezd
Shtetls
Holocaust locations in Latvia
Jewish communities destroyed in the Holocaust